KSHO-TV may refer to:

KSHO-TV (Las Vegas), ABC station started 1956 (known as KTNV since 1980)
KSHO-TV (Honolulu), TBN station started 1982 (known as KAAH-TV since 2003)

See also
KSHO, American AM radio station ("Unforgettable 920") in Lebanon, Oregon, started 1950 as KGAL